Prestia is an Italian surname. Notable people with the surname include:

Charles J. Prestia (1909–1953), American politician
Giacomo Prestia (born 1960), Italian opera singer
Giuseppe Prestia (born 1993), Italian footballer
Rocco Prestia (1951–2020), American bassist
Shirley Prestia (1947–2011), American actress

Italian-language surnames